The Washington Stealth were a member of the National Lacrosse League, the professional box lacrosse league of North America from the 2010 NLL season through the 2013 NLL season.  They were based in Everett (part of the Seattle metropolitan area), with home games played at the 8,513-seat Comcast Arena at Everett.

The team was previously known as the Albany Attack from 2000 until 2003, and later the San Jose Stealth from 2004 until 2009.

On July 24, 2012, the Stealth and Comcast Arena announced that they had agreed to new terms on a five-year lease that will keep the team in Everett through the 2017 season.

On June 27, 2013, it was announced that the team was moving to Langley, British Columbia for the 2014 NLL season. Later that day it was announced they would be called the Vancouver Stealth.

All-time record

Playoff results

Awards and honors

References

NLL press release announcing the move
Stealth press release announcing the move

Defunct National Lacrosse League teams
Sports in Everett, Washington
Lacrosse clubs established in 2009
Sports clubs disestablished in 2013
Lacrosse teams in Washington (state)